Ulam is a traditional salad produced from the fresh leaves, vegetables or fruits which can be eaten raw or after soaked in hot water e.g. Centella asiatica. It is typically eaten with sauces such as anchovies, cincalok or sambal.  It is recognised as a popular vegetable dish in traditional villages.

Ulam can be eaten simply as it is such as cucumber, cabbage and longbean.  Another type of ulam is traditional ulam, in which it is used more as an ingredient, such as in nasi ulam (ulam rice), nasi kerabu (a type of bluish-coloured rice) and cooking with other vegetables.  It also has its uses in Ayurvedic and traditional medicine, such as diabetes and high blood pressure.

See also

 Malay cuisine
 List of salads
 Lalab
 Pecel
 Rojak
 Urap

References

Further reading
 Wan Hassan, W.E. and M. Mahmood.(2010) Ulam: Salad Herbs of Malaysia. Kuala Lumpur: MASBE.

Indonesian cuisine
Malaysian cuisine
Malay cuisine
Vegetable dishes
Salads
Vegetable dishes of Indonesia
Vegetarian dishes of Indonesia